The A1067 is an English A road entirely in the county of Norfolk. It runs from  Fakenham Northern By-Pass (A148) to Norwich inner ring road (A147).

Future developments

Norwich Western Link

Norfolk County Council are developing a proposal for a link road between the A1067 at Attlebridge and A47 at Easton known as the Norwich Western Link.

References

Roads in England
Transport in Norfolk